Cedarville is a town in the Alfred Nzo District Municipality of Eastern Cape, South Africa.

A village at the foot of the Cedarberg from which it gets its name from, it lies 48 km north-west of Kokstad and 278 km from Pietermaritzburg. In 1912 a village management board was established. Cedarville was in Cape Province until in 1978 becoming part of Natal and then its successor KwaZulu-Natal, and in 2006 became part of Eastern Cape province.

References

Populated places in the Matatiele Local Municipality